David Deas may refer to:
 Sir David Deas (Royal Navy officer) (1807–1876), Scottish medical officer in the Royal Navy
 David Deas (rugby union) (1919–2001), Scottish rugby union player
 David Deas (mayor) (1771–1822), intendant (mayor) of Charleston, South Carolina